Richard Haughton (born 1980) is an English rugby union footballer.

Richard Haughton may also refer to:

Richard Brownrigg Haughton (1864–1929), American judge, 5th Commander-in-Chief of the Sons of Confederate Veterans
Richard Haughton, editor of the Boston Atlas
Richard Haughton of Joseph Beers v. Richard Haughton on List of United States Supreme Court cases, volume 34

See also
Richard Houghton (disambiguation)